mRNA-1283 is a COVID-19 vaccine candidate developed by Moderna.

An expectation, or hope seems to be that this "next generation" vaccine can be stored at regular refrigerator temperature (2-5 ºC).

Clinical Trial  

In December, Moderna started a clinical trial which would evaluate the vaccine's ability to provoke an immune response and its safety. As of September 2022, the trial is in Phase 2

References 

Clinical trials
American COVID-19 vaccines
RNA vaccines